Trivago N.V., marketed with lowercase styling as trivago, is a German technology company specializing in internet-related services and products in the hotel, lodging and metasearch fields. The company is headquartered in Düsseldorf. The American online travel company Expedia Group owns a majority of the company's stock.

History
The company was founded in Düsseldorf, Germany, in January 2005. Seeing an opportunity in the hotel search space, the founding team developed Germany's first hotel search engine. Shortly after launch, Stephan Stubner resigned as Managing Director, but the three other founders (Rolf Schrömgens, Peter Vinnemeier and Malte Siewert) remained.

Initially, Trivago received €1 million from investors, including the Samwer brothers, Florian Heinemann, and Christian Vollmann. In 2007, Trivago received US$1.14 million in Series B funding from the British company HOWZAT media LLP. In December 2010, Trivago sold a quarter of the company for US$52.86 million to a US investment fund, Insight Venture Partners.

In December 2012, Expedia, an American travel company, announced that it would acquire a stake in Trivago for $632 million. The deal was completed in 2013.

In December 2014, Trivago acquired mobile app product and development company Rheinfabrik. After the acquisition, Rheinfabrik remains independent from Trivago in its work.

In 2015, Trivago reported more than US$500 million in revenue.

In March 2016, Trivago announced it had acquired a portion of Cloud-PMS company Base7booking.

In April 2016, Trivago reached 1,000 employees and began building a new campus in Düsseldorf.

On December 16, 2016, Trivago became publicly traded on the NASDAQ exchange under the ticker symbol TRVG.

On November 5, 2019, CEO Rolf Schrömgens announced he will step down at the end of the year and be replaced by Chief Financial Officer Axel Hefer.

Due to the COVID-19 pandemic, Trivago 2020 had to cut many jobs. In March 2020, sales had fallen by 95% compared to the previous year.

In January 2021, Trivago acquired weekend.com, a startup focused on finding travelers inspirational weekend getaway packages.

In May 2021, Trivago joined Chelsea Football Club as the club’s Official Training Wear Partner.

Operations
Trivago is headquartered in Düsseldorf, where the international operations are conducted and 100% of the company's employees work.

Business model
As a hotel price comparison website, Trivago makes money from advertising partners primarily using a cost-per-click (CPC) business model. Booking platforms, hoteliers and other providers list rates and advertise on the Trivago site, paying for the clicks received from Trivago users.

Trivago also offers free and fee-based versions of its Hotel Manager product, which hoteliers use to market their facilities on the Trivago site. Trivago claims to be the world's largest online hotel search site, comparing rates from over 1 million hotels and more than 250 booking sites worldwide. Since their majority shareholder is Expedia, the effort is to direct bookings to their sites by way of various "adjustments" to how other sites' rates are perceived.

Products and features
Trivago app
Trivago Hotel Manager 
Hotel Manager Pro
Rate Connect

Indices and rankings

Trivago Rating Index (tRI)
The tRI aggregates all ratings for destinations listed on Trivago and ranks them between 0 and 100. The index includes criteria such as location, price, food, internet, room and facilities, and is used to create annual Trivago rankings and awards such as the Reputation Ranking, Island Ranking, Ski Ranking, the Top Hotel Awards, and the Best Value Destinations (based on an algorithm combining the tRI with price).

Trivago Hotel Price Index (tHPI)
The Trivago Hotel Price Index (tHPI) displays the average overnight accommodation prices for the most popular cities worldwide. Prices are based on the cost of a standard double room, taken from over 2 million daily price inquiries over the past month.

Marketing
Trivago focuses on online marketing (SEM and display advertising), public relations and brand marketing (TV).

The "Trivago guy"
When the company aired its first U.S. TV advertisement in 2012, the ad's spokesman inspired a trending Twitter hashtag, #trivagoguy, based on his unusual look.
According to Rolling Stone, Trivago "wanted someone real, approachable and genuine" when it chose actor Tim Williams to star in the ad. The Trivago guy became an unexpected celebrity, with some people noting his unbuttoned shirt and creepy vibe, while others found his scruffy appearance and deep voice "inexplicably sexy".

Trivago responded to the comments by launching a contest that invited people to give the Trivago guy a makeover. The Trivago guy inspired parodies, fan fiction and a large gay following.

Many commenters asked why Trivago chose not to have the actor wear a belt. According to the actor, that was an accident. "Unfortunately none of the belts fit the belt loops that I had on," Williams said. "I think that was probably the best break we could have gotten." Following the large response for the U.S. Trivago guy, the company decided to create French and Spanish Trivago guys.
From 2016 until June 2017, the French actor Mehdi Nebbou was the German Trivago guy.

For Latin America (the whole Spanish-speaking region) Trivago's commercials are presented by Spanish actor Gonzalo Peña. In Brazil, the man shown on screen is the well-known actor and model Willian Mello.

In 2016, the company aired ads in India with Abhinav Kumar. Abhinav became popular and an internet sensation for his role in ubiquitous Trivago ads in India.
As of now the Trivago guy has turned into an internet meme.

The "Trivago girl"
In the UK, Trivago's advertisements are fronted by Australian actress and musician Gabrielle Miller.
In Japan, Trivago is represented in their TV commercials by singer/songwriter Natalie Emmons, who uses the pseudonym "Strae" in the United States. In Malaysia, actress and TV host Dahlia Shazwan has starred in Trivago's advertisements.

Legal issues 
In August 2018, the Australian Competition & Consumer Commission (ACCC) alleged in a court case brought against Trivago in the Federal Court of Australia that the company had misled consumers on their website and in their television advertising. The court found that search results were ordered giving preference to the highest paying "cost per click" advertisers, rather than outright cheapest prices. It was also found that the company's television advertising misled consumers by purporting to be "impartial and objective", when it fact it wasn't. The ACCC case started in the Federal Court of Australia in September 2019. In January 2020, the court found that Trivago breached Australian consumer law by misleading consumers on which hotel deals were best and made false representations to consumers. The ACCC argued Trivago promised customers impartial, objective and transparent hotel price comparisons which would allow them to quickly and easily identify the cheapest offer available. Instead, Trivago promoted its best advertisers, the ACCC claimed. The ACCC claimed Trivago failed to properly disclose its operating model and used misleading "strike-through" price comparisons that compared a more expensive luxury room with a standard room.

In April 2022, the Federal Court fined Trivago AUD44.7 million, plus legal costs for misleading consumers. The ACCC had pushed for a fine of AUD90 million. Justice Moshinsky of the Federal Court noted Trivago's breaches of the law were "extremely serious".

See also
 Webjet

References

External links

 

2005 establishments in Germany
2013 mergers and acquisitions
2016 initial public offerings
Companies based in Düsseldorf
Companies listed on the Nasdaq
Expedia Group
German travel websites
Hospitality companies established in 2005
Information technology companies of Germany
Internet properties established in 2005
Metasearch engines
Travel ticket search engines
German subsidiaries of foreign companies